Remixes – Japan Tour Mini Album is a remix album by English boy band Blue, released exclusively in Japan in January 2004. The album collects material featured on a selection of the band's singles, the majority of which not released in Japan.

Track listing
 "Fly By II" - 3:48 
 "Megamix" - 6:48
 "U Make Me Wanna" (Urban North Edit) - 3:18
 "All Rise" (Blacksmith RnB Club Rub) - 5:11
 "If You Come Back" (The Playa's Mix) - 3:57
 "Sorry Seems to Be the Hardest Word" (Ruffin Ready Soul Mix) - 3:51
 "Love R.I.P" - 3:38
 "If You Come Back" (8 Jam Street Mix) - 4:56
 "Too Close" (Blacksmith RnB Club Rub) - 5:41
 "If You Come Back" (Blacksmith Smooth RnB Rub) - 3:54
 "All Rise" (Acoustic Version) - 3:40
 "The Gift" (Music Video) - 5:02

Charts

References

Blue (English band) remix albums
2004 remix albums
EMI Records remix albums